Winnebago Creek is a  tributary of the Mississippi River in southeastern Minnesota.  Winnebago Creek was named after the Winnebago Indians.

Course
Winnebago Creek flows in Houston  County, Minnesota into the Mississippi River just above the Minnesota and Iowa border.  The creek flows through the Winnebago Creek Wildlife Management Area.  Sections of Winnebago Creek are designated trout streams and populated with Rainbow trout and brown trout.

See also
List of rivers of Minnesota
Winnebago, Minnesota

References

Rivers of Houston County, Minnesota
Rivers of Minnesota
Tributaries of the Mississippi River
Southern Minnesota trout streams
Driftless Area